Pammeces pallida is a moth of the family Agonoxenidae. It was described by Thomas de Grey, 6th Baron Walsingham, in 1897. It is found in the West Indies.

References

Moths described in 1897
Agonoxeninae
Moths of the Caribbean